The Pacific Surfliner is a  passenger train service serving the communities on the coast of Southern California between San Diego and San Luis Obispo.

The service carried 2,924,117 passengers during fiscal year 2016, a 3.4% increase from FY2015. Total revenue during FY2016 was $73,020,267, an increase of 3.6% over FY2015. The Pacific Surfliner is Amtrak's third-busiest service (exceeded in ridership only by the Northeast Regional and Acela Express), and the busiest outside the Northeast Corridor.

Like all regional trains in California, the Pacific Surfliner is operated by a joint powers authority. The Los Angeles – San Diego – San Luis Obispo (LOSSAN) Rail Corridor Agency is governed by a board that includes eleven elected representatives from the six counties the train travels through. LOSSAN contracts with the Orange County Transportation Authority to provide day-to-day management of the service and with contracts with Amtrak to operate the service and maintain the rolling stock (locomotives and passenger cars). The California Department of Transportation (Caltrans) provides the funding to operate the service and also owns all of the locomotives and some of the rolling stock; with Amtrak owning the rest.

Emergency repairs were expected to take at least 90 days. However, as of January 2023, the line between Irvine and Oceanside has yet to be reopened. According to the Pacific Surfliner's website, repairs wouldn't be fully completed until late March 2023.

Operations

Much of the Pacific Surfliner's scenic route follows the Pacific coast, with the tracks being less than 100 feet from the ocean in some locations. However, trains travel inland through expansive farmlands in Ventura County and industrial backlots in the Los Angeles Basin, San Fernando Valley, and parts of Orange County.

, the Pacific Surfliner operates ten daily round trips between Los Angeles and San Diego. Four round trips run north of Los Angeles: two run all the way to San Luis Obispo, and two run to Goleta (near Santa Barbara), with Amtrak Thruway motorcoach service over the rest of the route to San Luis Obispo.

Thruway motorcoach connections are also available to San Pedro; to Palm Springs and Indio; and to San Jose or Oakland (with connections to Capitol Corridor trains) via Paso Robles.

Because the stations at the ends of the line do not have wyes to turn equipment, trains are operated in push-pull mode. The locomotive is at the rear of the train, pushing the train from Goleta, San Luis Obispo or San Diego to Los Angeles. At Los Angeles, the train reverses at the station, and the locomotive pulls the train to San Diego or Goleta/San Luis Obispo, respectively. Run-through tracks are proposed at Union Station in Los Angeles to ease congestion and reduce time spent waiting to enter or depart the station.

LOSSAN Rail Corridor Agency 
Local agencies along with the host railroads formed the Los Angeles–San Diego-San Luis Obispo Rail Corridor Agency (LOSSAN) in 1989. The Pacific Surfliner is operated by Amtrak under the Amtrak California brand with funding provided by the California Department of Transportation (Caltrans). Serious discussions were held in 2009 regarding the local agencies administering the service rather than Caltrans. California Senate Bill No. 1225, passed in 2014, allowed LOSSAN to amend the joint powers agreement and become the sponsor of state-supported intercity passenger rail service in the corridor. In mid-2015, LOSSAN assumed oversight for the Surfliner. They are also working with Caltrans to assess rail operations from Los Angeles to San Diego to develop better connections, close gaps in the schedule, and optimize the assets of the railroad. The ongoing North Coast Corridor project plans to increase rail capacity on the route of the Surfliner in North San Diego County.

History 

The route is the successor of the San Diegan, a Los Angeles-San Diego service operated since 1938 by the Santa Fe Railway. It had been one of the Santa Fe's premier routes until Amtrak took over operations in 1971. Initially there were three daily trips, but the schedule was expanded to six round trips during the 1970s with funding from the state of California. In 1988 the service was extended to Santa Barbara to provide the Central Coast with an additional train to Los Angeles, followed in 1995 with one trip a day going all the way to San Luis Obispo. To better reflect the route's extent, it was renamed the Pacific Surfliner in 2000.  The route is named after the Surf Line, which now comprises the route's busiest section from Los Angeles to San Diego.

A stop at Old Town Transit Center was added in 2004. Stops at Orange and Laguna Niguel/Mission Viejo were added in 2007 but dropped in 2012. On October 7, 2013, stops were added at Coaster stations at Carlsbad Village, Carlsbad Poinsettia, Encinitas and Sorrento Valley. The Carlsbad Poinsettia and Encinitas stops were dropped on October 9, 2017, due to low ridership. The Carlsbad Village and Sorrento Valley stops were dropped on October 8, 2018, due to changes with the cross-ticketing arrangement with Coaster.

A 13th daily round trip was added on October 14, 2019.

Route

The Pacific Surfliner runs on track owned by several private railroads and public agencies:
 Union Pacific Railroad (Coast Line): San Luis Obispo – Moorpark
 Southern California Regional Rail Authority: Moorpark – Los Angeles
 BNSF Railway: Los Angeles – Fullerton
 Southern California Regional Rail Authority: Fullerton – Orange County/San Diego County line
 North County Transit District: Orange County/San Diego County line – San Diego

Stations 

Rolling stock 

The Pacific Surfliner uses push-pull trainsets with a diesel locomotive at one end and a cab car at the other. Eight of the nine trainsets used for regular service use a fleet of 49 bilevel Surfliner coaches (39 owned by Amtrak and 10 by Caltrans), plus nine leased Amtrak Superliner long-distance coaches modified for push-pull operation. A typical six-car set has a business class car; three coach cars; a coach/café car with food sales on the lower level; and a coach/baggage/cab car equipped with coach seating, a checked baggage space on the lower level, and engineer's operating cab. The ninth trainset consists of leased Amtrak equipment: Horizon or Amfleet passenger cars plus a Non-Powered Control Unit. The Surfliner cars will be supplemented and partially replaced by new Siemens single-level cars beginning in 2020. In 2018, to provide additional capacity before the new cars arrive, LOSSAN began negotiating with the Great Lakes Central Railroad to lease bilevel railcars previously refurbished for a never-opened commuter railroad in Michigan.

The Surfliner cars were introduced in 2000–02, and were designed specifically to handle the demands of the nation's third-busiest rail line. They replaced the California Cars which had been introduced on the then-San Diegan in 1996, and had been fraught with problems in the latter part of the 1990s.

A dedicated fleet of 14 Caltrans-owned Siemens Charger locomotives began pre-revenue testing in October 2018 and entered revenue service later that year. The Chargers replaced a fleet of 15 Amtrak-owned EMD F59PHI locomotives (built in 1998), which were sold to Metra on March 2, 2019. Amtrak-owned GE P42DC locomotives (which are also used at other times) were temporarily used as motive power until the Chargers were ready for service. The Surfliner cars and Charger locomotives (and previously the F59PHI locomotives) are painted in a blue and silver livery that is unique to the Pacific Surfliner.

Additional Amtrak-owned cars are added (up to 12-car consists) during periods of high demand, including the San Diego Comic-Con, the San Diego County Fair, events at the Del Mar racetrack, and after the 2018 Southern California mudflows closed Highway 101. Amtrak Great Dome car Ocean View was occasionally used as an additional business class car prior to its retirement in 2019.

References

Notes

External links

Los Angeles–San Diego-San Luis Obispo Rail Corridor Agency (LOSSAN)
Amtrak California

Amtrak routes
Transportation in Southern California
Public transportation in San Luis Obispo County, California
Public transportation in Santa Barbara County, California
Public transportation in Ventura County, California
Public transportation in Los Angeles County, California
Public transportation in Orange County, California
Public transportation in San Diego County, California
Passenger rail transportation in California
Airport rail links in the United States
Higher-speed rail